Bindlosse is a surname. Notable people with the surname include:

 Robert Bindlosse (1624–1688), English politician
 Francis Bindlosse ( 1603–1629), English politician